Salim Iles (born 14 May 1975, in Oran) is an Algerian swimmer who competes in the freestyle events.

He was named Algerian Sportsman of the Year in 1998. He is a scholarship holder with the Olympic Solidarity program.

Olympic achievements
2004 Olympic Games - eighth place (50m freestyle)
2004 Olympic Games - seventh place (100m freestyle)
2000 Olympic Games - semi-finalist (100m freestyle)

References
 Sports123
 sports-reference

 

1975 births
Living people
Algerian male freestyle swimmers
Swimmers at the 1996 Summer Olympics
Swimmers at the 2000 Summer Olympics
Swimmers at the 2004 Summer Olympics
Swimmers at the 2008 Summer Olympics
Olympic swimmers of Algeria
Sportspeople from Oran
Medalists at the FINA World Swimming Championships (25 m)
Mediterranean Games gold medalists for Algeria
Swimmers at the 1997 Mediterranean Games
Swimmers at the 2001 Mediterranean Games
Swimmers at the 2005 Mediterranean Games
African Games gold medalists for Algeria
African Games medalists in swimming
African Games silver medalists for Algeria
African Games bronze medalists for Algeria
Mediterranean Games medalists in swimming
Competitors at the 1995 All-Africa Games
Competitors at the 1999 All-Africa Games
Competitors at the 2003 All-Africa Games
Competitors at the 2007 All-Africa Games
21st-century Algerian people